The 2011 Smithville, Mississippi tornado was an extremely violent EF5 wedge tornado that devastated areas of rural Mississippi, including the town of Smithville, Mississippi during the afternoon of April 27, 2011, resulting in catastrophic damage and numerous fatalities. The tornado was a part of the 2011 Super Outbreak, the largest tornado outbreak in United States history. The tornado reached an estimated maximum width of 3/4 of a mile, (1.2 km) with wind speeds up to 205 mph (330 km/h).

Meteorological synopsis

The environmental conditions leading up to the April 2011 Super Outbreak were among the "most conducive to violent tornadoes ever documented". On April 25, a vigorous upper-level shortwave trough that moved into the Southern Plains states. Ample instability, low-level moisture, and wind shear fueled a significant tornado outbreak from Texas to Tennessee; at least 64 tornadoes touched down on this day. An area of low pressure consolidated over Texas on April 26 and traveled east while the aforementioned shortwave trough traversed the Mississippi River and Ohio River valleys. Another 50 tornadoes touched down on this day. The multi-day outbreak culminated on April 27 with the most violent day of tornadic activity since the 1974 Super Outbreak. Multiple episodes of tornadic activity ensued with two waves of mesoscale convective systems in the morning hours followed by a widespread outbreak of supercells from Mississippi to North Carolina during the afternoon into the evening.

Activity on April 27 was precipitated by a 995 mbar (hPa; 29.39 inHg) surface low situated over Kentucky and a deep, negatively tilted (aligned northwest to southeast) trough over Arkansas and Louisiana. A strong southwesterly surface jet intersected these systems at a 60° angle, an ageostrophic flow that led to storm-relative helicity values in excess of 500 m2s−2—indicative of extreme wind shear and a very high potential for rotating updrafts within supercells. Furthermore, convective available potential energy (CAPE) values reached 2,500–3,000 J/kg−1.

Tornado summary
CDT (2042 UTC), snapping numerous trees near the Smithville Recreation Area. The fast-moving tornado then rapidly intensified as it approached town, reaching EF5 intensity. As the storm crossed Davis Road South, the ground was deeply scoured in a nearby field, leaving a trench in the ground that was still visible in aerial photographs taken more than a year later. The tornado began producing remarkably intense damage and swept away multiple homes and structures as it moved northeast, following MS 25. The first fatality from the tornado occurred in this area as a bed and breakfast was obliterated and swept from its foundation, with debris from the structure scattered long distances downwind. Cinder blocks from the structure were broken into small pieces of concrete and strewn throughout a nearby field. A semi-truck was thrown  and destroyed in this area, and an RV was thrown  and partially embedded into the ground nearby. One brick residence was swept away along this segment of the path as well, and part of its concrete foundation slab was pulled up and slightly dislodged, with extensive ground scouring and debarking of trees noted on the property. The tornado scoured the topsoil to a depth of a foot. Some metal storage buildings and 14 mobile homes were obliterated nearby, with metal framing from some of the mobile homes thrown and twisted into pieces. A semi truck was torn apart with the only remaining piece found 1.4 miles away.

The tornado then entered Smithville at maximum intensity, producing EF5 damage as it moved through both commercial and residential areas. Dozens of large, anchor-bolted, well-built brick homes were completely swept away in town, and many large hardwood trees were completely debarked and denuded. All furniture, appliances, and plumbing from homes in the tornado's direct path of were either shredded or missing, and some homes had floor tiles scoured from their foundations. Shrubbery along the perimeters of some homes was shredded and/or stripped as well, and debris from many of the obliterated homes was finely granulated into small pieces. An SUV was thrown a  into the top of the Smithville water tower, then bounced off of it, and was hurled an additional  before impacting the ground and eventually coming to rest on the opposite side of the city, where it was later found crushed into a tiny ball. The city hall, the post office, four churches, several businesses, the water system, and the police station were all destroyed as the tornado moved through town. Tar and chip pavement was torn from a road in town and rolled into piles, intense ground scouring was noted in several areas, and a 1965 Chevrolet pickup truck was thrown from one residence and never found. Several other vehicles in town were thrown hundreds of yards, torn into multiple pieces, stripped down to their frames, or wrapped around trees as well. The local medical clinic was destroyed as well, with supplies being scattered around the city. The large brick E.E. Pickle Funeral Home was reduced to a bare slab as the tornado exited at the northeast side of the city, with the debris scattered and wind-rowed into an adjacent wooded area. Extreme debarking of trees was noted in this area, and pieces of vehicles and structures were strewn long distances throughout the woods. The mangled remains of the SUV that impacted the water tower was found in a ditch at the edge of this wooded area. Nearby granite tombstones from a cemetery were blown over in the opposite direction of the tornado's passage, and some were broken and thrown. Overall, the tornado destroyed 117 structures in Smithville and damaged 50 others, killing 16 people. The tornado weakened as it continued through rural areas northeast of town and moved into Itawamba County, where it uprooted numerous trees and power lines and caused roof damage to a house before exiting the county.

The tornado then continued across the Alabama state line into Marion County, where it caused EF1 damage to outbuildings and mobile homes near Bexar. The tornado produced additional high-end EF3 damage as it continued north of Hamilton, where several mobile homes and frame homes were destroyed, including one frame home at the bottom of a ravine that was swept clean from its foundation (though lack of road access prevented close inspection of the home's construction, precluding a potential higher rating at that location). Several additional homes were damaged and a chicken house was destroyed as the tornado approached Franklin County. The tornado then crossed the county line and weakened to EF2 strength, where it snapped and uprooted numerous large trees, damaged or destroyed several chicken houses, totaled a car, destroyed a mobile home, tore much of the roof off of a two-story house, and caused significant roof damage to several other homes before dissipating near the town of Hodges at 4:23 p.m. CDT (2123 UTC).

Internet fiction
In 2012, a presentation and paper, given at the 26th Conference on Severe Local Storms by Eugene W. McCaul, with the Universities Space Research Association; Kevin R. Knupp, an atmospheric science professor at the University of Alabama; Chris Darden, a meteorologist at the National Weather Service of Huntsville, Alabama; and Kevin Laws, a meteorologist at the National Weather Service of Birmingham, Alabama, stated fictional information about the tornado was being spread online. Specifically, reports that the EF5 tornado had ripped a steel drainage pipe out of the ground were proven to have been fabricated and that road crews had dug up the pipe to ensure vehicular safety as the road was previously declared unsafe.

See also
Tornadoes of 2011
List of F5 and EF5 tornadoes

References

External links
 http://www.srh.noaa.gov/meg/?n=apr2011toroutbreaksmithville 
 https://web.archive.org/web/20160520115254/http://ngs.woc.noaa.gov/storms/apr11_tornado/
 http://www.ncdc.noaa.gov/stormevents/eventdetails.jsp?id=303562
 https://www.youtube.com/watch?v=fmI_2iYuchc
 http://www.commercialappeal.com/news/2011/oct/23/deadly-tornado-smithville-mississippi 
 http://www.ncdc.noaa.gov/stormevents/eventdetails.jsp?id=303563
 http://www.srh.noaa.gov/hun/?n=4272011_franklin_county_hodges 
 http://www.srh.noaa.gov/bmx/?n=event_04272011shotsville 

Smithville, Mississippi-Shottsville, Alabama
F5 tornadoes by date
Smithville,2011-04-27
Shottsville,2011-04-27
Smithville, Mississippi-Shottsville, Alabama tornado
Tornado,2011-04-27,Smithville, Mississippi-Shottsville, Alabama
Smithsville tornado,2011-04-27
Shottsville tornado,2011-04-27
Smithsville, Mississippi-Shottsville, Alabama tornado